Bill Shanahan (born July 27, 1938) is a former American  football coach.  He served as the head football coach at Western New Mexico University  in Silver City, New Mexico from 1969 to 1972 and Western Illinois University in Macomb, Illinois from 1976 until 1978, compiling a career college football coaching record of 25–37–1.

Head coaching record

References

External links
 http://www.broomfieldenterprise.com/columnists/ci_13044985

1938 births
Living people
American football centers
Huron Screaming Eagles football players
Northern Colorado Bears football coaches
Utah Utes football coaches
Western Illinois Leathernecks football coaches
Western New Mexico Mustangs football coaches
Western Colorado Mountaineers football coaches
Adams State University alumni
University of Utah alumni
People from Wahoo, Nebraska